The Norwegian Archive, Library and Museum Authority (ABM-utvikling or Statens senter for arkiv, bibliotek og museum) is a Norwegian government agency under the Norwegian Ministry of Culture and Church Affairs responsible for archival, library and museum services.

The Norwegian Archive, Library and Museum Authority have several web services, as kulturnett.no and the Norwegian digital library as the most prominent.

It was founded on 1 January 2003, following the merger of the Norwegian Directorate for Public Libraries, the Norwegian Museum Authority, and the National Office for Research Documentation, Academic and Special Libraries.

See also
Norwegian Year of Cultural Heritage 2009
List of museums in Norway

External links
Official site (Norwegian)
Kulturnett.no (Norwegian)
Norwegian digital library (English)
The Norwegian Ministry of Culture and Church Affairs (English)

Norwegian culture
Archive, Library and Museum Authority
Government agencies established in 2003